The Firos (FIROS) was an Italian multiple rocket launcher system developed during the Cold War.  The 122 mm rockets were mounted on an armoured 6×6 truck (lorry) for mobility. The Firos vehicles were mounted with forty 122 mm long range rockets. The 122 mm rocket was designed as a surface-to-surface rocket.

The first version developed was the Firos-25, 48 of which were exported to the United Arab Emirates in the 1980s. The more powerful Firos-30, with a range of over 30 km, were built in the late 1980s, and entered into service with the Italian Army in 1987.

The Firos were similar to the Russian BM-21 Grad in that they both used 122 mm rockets in groups of forty, although they differed considerably in command and control systems and base vehicle.

Notes

External links
  includes photo 

Wheeled self-propelled rocket launchers
Self-propelled artillery of Italy
Rocket artillery
Multiple rocket launchers